The Christie Harris Illustrated Children's Literature Prize is awarded annually as the BC Book Prize for Canadian authors and illustrator of picture books, picture story books, and illustrated non-fiction books. The prize is shared by the author and the illustrator, who must be a resident of British Columbia or Yukon. It was announced in 2002 and first awarded in 2003. A handful of finalists (roughly 25%) are also selected for another award: participation in the expenses-paid BC Book Prizes on Tour, a week-long tour across the province to present their books at schools and libraries each April.

History
The prize was announced three months after the death of Christie Harris, and was the first new BC Book Prize category since the Sheila A. Egoff Children's Literature Prize was introduced in 1987.

Winners and finalists

References

External links

 Christie Harries Illustrated Children's Literature Prize, official website
 BC Book Prizes

BC and Yukon Book Prizes
2003 establishments in British Columbia
Awards established in 2003
Canadian children's literary awards
Illustrated book awards
Picture book awards